Nacional Atlético Clube may refer to:
Nacional Atlético Clube (SP), Brazilian football club from São Paulo
Nacional Atlético Clube (MG), Brazilian football club from Muriaé, Minas Gerais, (not to be confused with other Minas Gerais football club named "Nacional")
Nacional Atlético Clube (Cabedelo), Brazilian football club from Cabedelo, Paraíba
Nacional Atlético Clube (Patos), Brazilian football club from Patos, Paraíba
Nacional Atlético Clube Sociedade Civil Ltda., Brazilian football club from Rolândia

See also
Atlético Nacional, a Colombian professional football team based in Medellín
Nacional (disambiguation), for other football clubs named Nacional